Switch is the first album by R&B band, Switch, released in 1978. It is also their first on the Motown subsidiary Gordy. After recording as White Heat and Hot Ice, this gave them the commercial breakthrough they desired with hits like "There'll Never Be" and "I Wanna Be Closer".

Track listing
"I Wanna Be with You" - (Bobby DeBarge)
"There'll Never Be" - (Bobby DeBarge)
"I Wanna Be Closer" - (Jermaine Jackson)
"We Like to Party... Come On" - (Bobby DeBarge, Gregory Williams)
"Fever" - (Greg Wright, Ronnie Vann)
"You Pulled a Switch" - (Greg Wright, Ronnie Vann)
"It's So Real" - (Michael B. Sutton, Brenda Sutton)
"Somebody's Watching You" - (Jody Sims)

Personnel
Switch
Bobby DeBarge - lead vocals, backing vocals, keyboards, drums
Tommy DeBarge - bass, backing vocals
Phillip Ingram - lead vocals, keyboards, percussion, backing vocals
Jody Sims - drums, percussion, backing vocals
Gregory Williams - trumpet, keyboards, backing vocals
Eddie Fluellen - keyboards, string ensemble, trombone, backing vocals
Guitarists
Lil' David Podis, Mike McGloiry, Ronnie Vann - guitar
Additional musicians
Jermaine Jackson

Charts

Singles

References

External links
 Switch-Switch at Discogs

1978 debut albums
Gordy Records albums
Switch (band) albums